The Men's heptathlon event  at the 2011 European Athletics Indoor Championships was held at March 5 and 6.

Records

Results

60 metres 
The heats were held at 9:00.

Long jump 
The event was held at 9:40.

Shot Put 
The event was held at 11:30.

High jump 
The event was held at 16:30.

60 metres hurdles 
The heats were held at 9:45.

Pole vault 
The event was held at 10:30.

1000 metres 
The race was held at 15:00.

Final standings
After the seven disciplines this was the final standing.

References

Combined events at the European Athletics Indoor Championships
2011 European Athletics Indoor Championships